Vinylphosphonic acid is an organophosphorus compound with the formula C2H3PO3H2.  It is a colorless, low-melting solid, although commercial samples are often yellowish viscous liquids.  It is used to prepare adhesives. As in other phosphonic acids, the phosphorus center is tetrahedral, being bonded to an organic group (vinyl in this case), two OH groups, and an oxygen.

Preparation
Vinylphosphonic acid can be prepared in several ways, but the most common involves the addition of PCl3 to acetaldehyde:
PCl3 + CH3CHO → CH3CH(O−)PCl3+
This adduct reacts with acetic acid: 
 CH3CH(O−)PCl3+ + 2 CH3CO2H → CH3CH(Cl)PO(OH)2 + 2 CH3COCl
This chloride undergoes dehydrochlorination to afford the target:
CH3CH(Cl)PO(OH)2 → CH2=CHPO(OH)2 + HCl

Applications
Polymerization of vinylphosphonic acid gives polyvinylphosphonic acid, which is best known for promoting adhesion between organic and inorganic phases. Such interfaces exist between coatings and the substrates to which they are applied. Both vinylphosphonic acid homopolymer and its copolymers are the basis of many products which have found applications in scale and corrosion treatment. Polyvinylphosphonic acid is an essential component for the polymer electrolyte membranes used in fuel cell development, in the medical field as dental cements, hydrogels for drug delivery, and components in biomimetic mineralization.

References

Phosphonic acids
Vinyl compounds